This article concerns the period 469 BC – 460 BC.

References